Warm Springs Creek may refer to:

Warm Springs Creek (California)
Warm Springs Creek (Montana), near Warm Springs, Montana
Warm Springs Creek (Idaho)

See also
Warm Spring Creek, Montana